Kentucky Constitutional Amendment 1 of 2004, is an amendment to the Kentucky Constitution that made it unconstitutional for the state to recognize or perform same-sex marriages or civil unions. The referendum was approved by 75% of the voters.

The text of the amendment states:

Only a marriage between one man and one woman shall be valid or recognized as a marriage in Kentucky. A legal status identical or substantially similar to that of marriage for unmarried individuals shall not be valid or recognized.

Legal Challenges

On September 10, 2013, the Kentucky Equality Federation sued the Commonwealth of Kentucky in Franklin Circuit Court claiming Kentucky's 2004 Constitutional Amendment banning same-sex marriage violated sections of the commonwealth's constitution. Case # 13-CI-1074 was assigned by the Franklin County Court Clerk (the location of the Kentucky State Capitol). The lawsuit was conceived by President Jordan Palmer, written and signed by Vice President of Legal Jillian Hall, Esq. On April 16, 2015, the case was decided in favor of the plaintiff by Franklin County Circuit Court Judge Thomas D. Wingate. 

This provision also became void in 2015 when the U.S. Supreme Court ruled in Obergefell v. Hodges that the fundamental right to marry is guaranteed to same-sex couples by both the Due Process Clause and the Equal Protection Clause of the Fourteenth Amendment to the United States Constitution.

Results

See also
LGBT rights in Kentucky
Same-sex marriage in Kentucky

References

External links
 The Money Behind the 2004 Marriage Amendments -- National Institute on Money in State Politics

U.S. state constitutional amendments banning same-sex unions
2004 in American law
2004 in LGBT history
LGBT in Kentucky
Same-sex marriage ballot measures in the United States
2004 Kentucky elections
2004 ballot measures
Kentucky ballot measures